Hinduism is a minority religion in Estonia followed by only 708 (0.1%) of its population as of 2010.

The religion was registered by the country along with Buddhism in the 1990s.

Demographics

The number of Hindus in Estonia is negligible. The 2000 census of Estonia showed 138 Hindus in Estonia.

According to the 2011 census, there are 295 people in Estonia following Hinduism. In the Census, there are 142 Hindus, 121 Hare Krishnas and 32 followers of Sahaja Yoga. About half of the Hindus lives in the Capital City Tallinn

See also
Hinduism in Lithuania
Hinduism in Russia
Hinduism by country

References

Estonia
Estonia
Religion in Estonia